Nivi (nīvī) was a women's garment. It was a simple piece of cloth draped or worn around the waist, covering the lower part of the body.

Meaning 
 in Sanskrit means a lower garment worn around a women's waist.

Garment 
Draping and wrapping were the accustomed forms of ancient Indian clothing. 

Vedas describes contemporary clothes according to the use and style of wrapping. Uttariya refers to an upper-body garment, Adivasah as an over garment, and Vasa as a lower body garment. Hence Nivi could be categorized in Vasa, that was a simple rectangular piece of clothing.

Style

Nivi drape
The ladies were encircling the nivi around the waist with tucked ends. It was an inner wrap for the lower body for women leaving the upper part bare. In old couture, it was also called 'nivi bandha.'

See also 
 Uttariya
 Vadhuya

References 

Hindu religious clothing
Indian clothing